Emicerfont (GW-876,008) is a drug developed by GlaxoSmithKline which acts as a CRF-1 antagonist. Corticotropin releasing factor (CRF), also known as Corticotropin releasing hormone, is an endogenous peptide hormone which is released in response to various triggers such as chronic stress, and activates the two corticotropin-releasing hormone receptors: CRF1 and CRF2. This then triggers the release of corticotropin (ACTH), another hormone which is involved in the physiological response to stress.

Emicerfont blocks the CRF1 receptor, and so reduces ACTH release. It has been investigated for the treatment of irritable bowel syndrome (IBS) and alcoholism, and while it was not effective enough to be adopted for medical use in these applications, it continues to be used for research, as the role of the CRH-ACTH system in IBS remains poorly understood.

See also 
 Corticotropin releasing hormone antagonists
 Antalarmin
 Pexacerfont
 Verucerfont

References 

Corticotropin-releasing hormone antagonists
Corticotropin-releasing hormone
Imidazolidinones
Phenol ethers
Pyrrolopyridines